Oleksandr Surutkovytch (born 8 January 1984 in Odessa) is a Ukrainian-Azerbaijani former professional road cyclist.

Major results

2005
 2nd Overall Tour of Romania
2006
 1st  Time trial, Ukrainian National Under-23 Road Championships
2010
 Kerman Tour
1st Stages 3 & 4
 7th Overall Tour of Romania
 8th Overall Tour du Maroc
 8th Emirates Cup
2011
 7th Overall Tour of Alanya
 10th Overall Tour of Gallipoli
2012
 Azerbaijani National Road Race Championships
1st  Road race
2nd Time trial
2013
 2nd Overall Tour d'Azerbaïdjan
2015
 1st  Mountains classification Tour d'Azerbaïdjan
2016
 2nd Belgrade–Banja Luka I
 3rd Belgrade–Banja Luka II
 8th Horizon Park Classic
 8th Grand Prix of Vinnytsia

References

External links

1984 births
Living people
Ukrainian male cyclists
Azerbaijani male cyclists
Sportspeople from Odesa